Amula may refer to:

Amula, Estonia, a village in Estonia
Amula, New Spain, a county-level jurisdiction in colonial New Spain